Dalia Susana González Rosado (born March 12, 1973) is an Ecuadorian politician, currently the Prefect of Guayas Province. She is a professional journalist with a licentiate in Social Communication and master's degree in International Political Science and Diplomacy.

Biography
Susana González Rosado was born Guayaquil on March 12, 1973. She is the daughter of Efraín González and Susana Rosado, and has five siblings.

She started working at age 14 as an assistant manager of a company during afternoons, while studying in the morning. She earned a master's degree in International Sciences and Diplomacy at the Antonio Parra Velasco Institute of Diplomacy at the University of Guayaquil in 2005.

She has been married to Spanish businessman Antonio Sola Ortigosa since 2012.

Political career
She was also political adviser to mayor Jaime Nebot from 2007 to 2009.

Member of the National Assembly
In 2009, she was elected to the National Assembly of Ecuador representing Guayas Province, where she was appointed to the Permanent Specialized Commission of Food Sovereignty and Development of the Agriculture and Fisheries sector.

Municipal councilor

While in office she directed the Environment and Tourism and Urban Development commissions. Appointed by the Board Commission, she carried out the roles that the Council imparts. Likewise, she participated in the study and resolution of all the municipal political propositions that correspond to the council. She resigned her seat in December 2018 in order to run for viceprefect of Guayas Province.

Viceprefect
Susana González Rosado was elected viceprefect of Guayas Province on March 24, 2019. She officially received her credentials on May 10.

References

External links
 

1973 births
Ecuadorian journalists
Living people
Members of the first National Assembly (Ecuador)
People from Guayaquil
Social Christian Party (Ecuador) politicians
University of Guayaquil alumni
Ecuadorian women journalists
21st-century Ecuadorian women politicians
21st-century Ecuadorian politicians
Universidad Laica Vicente Rocafuerte de Guayaquil
Women members of the National Assembly (Ecuador)